Ross McCall (born 13 January 1976) is a Scottish actor best known for his roles as T-5 Joseph Liebgott in the HBO miniseries Band of Brothers (2001) and Matthew Keller in the hit series White Collar. He played the child version of Freddie Mercury in the music video for the Queen single "The Miracle".

Career
McCall was born in Port Glasgow to John and Maggie McCall but was raised in England from the age of 7, when his family relocated to Kent. His older brother, Stuart, is a policeman in Sussex. His father was a fire chief and his mother was a nurse. His parents later amicably divorced. Both live in England. His first notable screen role was at the age of 13 when he appeared as Freddie Mercury in the 1989 music video for the Queen song "The Miracle". In 1993, he was featured in BBC children's television series The Return of the Borrowers.

In 2001, McCall acted in the HBO miniseries Band of Brothers. Years later, in 2005, Ross co-starred in the independent drama film Green Street (2005) and later reprised his role as Dave in the 2009 straight-to-video sequel Green Street 2: Stand Your Ground. He then played Kenny Battaglia in the television series Crash, on the Starz network.

In 2008, McCall co-starred in an After Dark Horrorfest film, Autopsy. On 23 February 2010, he appeared as a guest star on White Collar in the episode "Bottlenecked" as Matthew Keller, an old rival of lead character Neal. He reprised the role in Episode 14 of Season 2, Episodes 9-11 of Season 3 and Episodes 2-6 of Season 6. On 1 June 2010, he appeared as a guest star on Luther. Serving Up Richard, shot at the Sunset Gower studios in LA, was released in 2011. He also had a recurring role as Ron Clark on 24: Live Another Day.

In June 2016, McCall released a short documentary detailing his trip to the Faroe Islands, and his support of Sea Shepherd's campaign, 'Operation Sleppið Grindini'. In the documentary, he interviewed several locals about their views on the controversial traditional pilot whale drive hunt known as the 'Grindadrap'. He also interviews several Sea Shepherd volunteers stationed in the Islands monitoring the activities of the hunters.

Personal life
McCall and his brother were raised in the Roman Catholic faith.

McCall was engaged to American actress Jennifer Love Hewitt, with whom he guest starred in an episode of Ghost Whisperer. On 5 January 2009, People magazine reported that Hewitt called off their engagement in late 2008.

References

External links

1976 births
Living people
People from Port Glasgow
People educated at Redroofs Theatre School
20th-century Scottish male actors
21st-century Scottish male actors
Scottish male film actors
Scottish male television actors
Scottish expatriates in the United States
Scottish Roman Catholics